Trepassey Bay is a natural bay located on the southeast end of the Avalon Peninsula of the island of Newfoundland, in the Canadian province of Newfoundland and Labrador.

Communities located in Trepassey Bay are; Trepassey, Biscay Bay and Portugal Cove South.

Gallery

See also
Baie des Trépassés

Bays of Newfoundland and Labrador